Henry Pybus "Budge" Bell-Irving,  (January 21, 1913 – September 21, 2002) was the 23rd Lieutenant Governor of British Columbia from 1978 to 1983.

Born in Vancouver, he was educated at Shawnigan Lake School on Vancouver Island and Loretto at Musselburgh, Scotland. He returned to attend the University of British Columbia, but withdrew because of the war. During World War II, Bell-Irving served with The Seaforth Highlanders of Canada and commanded a company of the battalion in Sicily and Italy and northwest Europe before becoming the commander of the 10th Canadian Infantry Brigade.

Next he returned to Vancouver and he joined his family real estate company, Bell-Irving Insurance Agencies, which later merged with A.E. LePage in 1972. In 1974 he was elected Chairman of the Vancouver Board of Trade.

In 1978, Governor General Jules Léger, on the advice of Prime Minister Pierre Trudeau, appointed him Lieutenant-Governor of BC.

Bell-Irving met his wife, Nancy, while attending UBC and was married in April 1937.

Honours
 1984 - he was made an Officer of the Order of Canada
 1985 - he received the Order of British Columbia.
 1986 - he was appointed Freeman of the City of Vancouver

External links
Biography from the website of the Lieutenant Governor of British Columbia

References
  In the Service of the Crown: The story of Budge and Nancy Bell-Irving by Raymond Eagle

Canadian Anglicans
Lieutenant Governors of British Columbia
Members of the Order of British Columbia
Officers of the Order of Canada
Canadian Officers of the Order of the British Empire
Companions of the Distinguished Service Order
Canadian Army personnel of World War II
People from Vancouver
1913 births
2002 deaths
People educated at Loretto School, Musselburgh
Seaforth Highlanders of Canada officers
Canadian military personnel from British Columbia
Shawnigan Lake School alumni